Houssin Rajallah (born 25 January 1982) is a Moroccan football defender who plays for Chabab Mohammédia.

Rajallah previously played for Raja Casablanca.

References

1982 births
Living people
Moroccan footballers
Raja CA players
Association football defenders
SCC Mohammédia players